Rora Blue is an American visual artist, fashion designer, and model. Their work primarily focuses on sexuality, gender, and disability. They are well-known for The Unsent Project and After the Beep. Blue's work primarily takes the form of text-based art, installations, and audience interaction. Blue's work also revolves around the importance of color. Blue has stated that their work is based on their every day experiences of being "multiply marginalized" as a person who is queer, disabled, and a gender minority.

Blue was born in California, but was raised in Texas. Blue began to create art after graduating high school. In 2021, they received a BFA in New Genres from the San Francisco Art Institute. Blue is currently a graduate student at the University of Nevada, Reno, and is pursuing a MFA. They were a recipient of a 2019-2020 VSA Emerging Young Artist Award from the John F. Kennedy Center for Performing Arts. Blue has late-stage neurological Lyme disease and POTS.

Notable works

Projects 

Blue is the founder of The Unsent Project, an archive where users can share text messages that they never sent. These submissions are then stored on the website. Visitors to the website can search and view messages that have been uploaded by other users. 
When uploading, users have the option to input a person's name, select a color, and to type their message. Uploads to the website are anonymous. To date, the website has over 5 million submissions. Blue has stated the reason why users can choose the color is to illustrate that colors can be representative of how a person views love. Blue stated that her inspiration for starting The Unsent Project was as follows:

Blue also started a similar project, titled After the Beep. Blue describes the project as:

Series 

Outside of their projects, Blue also has various art series. "Sweet Dreams" is a word art collection of ableist microaggressions. These phrases and sayings are fastened on everyday objects, such as pillows and bath tubs. Another art series, entitled "Handle with Care", positions sexist comments, colored in red, on people, balloons, skirts, underwear, and soup."(Don't)" is similar, transposing comments that force gender roles onto men on shirts, receipts, clothes, and mirrors. "Chronic Illness Reimagined As Something Glamorous" features medication and pills as jewelry. In one photo of the series, Blue is hooked into an IV bag filled with a glittery, blue fluid.

Pill, Ow is an art book edited by Blue that features the artwork of 37 different artists. While varied in their composition, all the artwork had to match the creator's color of their medication. The book is hand-binded, being sewn together with surgical sutures. The cover art is by Jayme Allen.

Notes

References

External links
 Rora Blue's Official Website
 Rora Blue's Instagram

American artists
Year of birth missing (living people)
Living people
San Francisco Art Institute alumni